El Paso County is a county located in the U.S. state of Colorado. The 2020 Census recorded its population as 730,395. The Census Bureau's 2020 result indicates it is the most populous county in Colorado, surpassing the City and County of Denver. The county seat is Colorado Springs, the second most populous city in Colorado. El Paso County is included in the Colorado Springs, Colorado, Metropolitan Statistical Area and is located in Colorado's 5th congressional district, except for the far eastern extremities, which are located in the  4th.

History
In July 1858, gold was discovered along the South Platte River in Arapahoe County, Kansas Territory. This discovery precipitated the Pike's Peak Gold Rush. Many residents of the mining region felt disconnected from the remote territorial governments of Kansas and Nebraska, so they voted to form their own Territory of Jefferson on October 24, 1859. The following month, the Jefferson Territorial Legislature organized 12 counties for the new territory including El Paso County. El Paso County was named for the Spanish language name for Ute Pass north of Pikes Peak. Colorado City served as the county seat of El Paso County.

The Jefferson Territory never received federal sanction, but on February 28, 1861, U.S. President James Buchanan signed an act organizing the Territory of Colorado. El Paso County was one of the original 17 counties created by the Colorado legislature on November 1, 1861. Part of its western territory was broken off to create Teller County in 1899. Originally based in Old Colorado City (now part of Colorado Springs, not today's Colorado City between Pueblo and Walsenburg), El Paso County's county seat was moved to Colorado Springs in 1873.

Geography

Adjacent counties
 Douglas County - north
 Elbert County - northeast
 Lincoln County - east
 Crowley County - southeast
 Pueblo County - south
 Fremont County - west
 Teller County - west

Major highways
  Interstate 25
 (Nevada Avenue)
  U.S. Highway 24
  U.S. Highway 85
  State Highway 16 (Mesa Ridge Parkway)
  State Highway 21 (Powers Boulevard)
  State Highway 83 (In El Paso County, CO SH-83 begins with the intersection of CO SH-21)
  State Highway 94
  State Highway 105
  State Highway 115

National protected area

 Pike National Forest

State protected area
 Cheyenne Mountain State Park

Historic sites
 Pikes Peak National Historic Landmark
 USAFA Cadet Area National Historic District
 Old Colorado City (National Register of Historic Districts)
 Manitou Springs (National Register of Historic Districts)

Trails

 American Discovery Trail
 Barr National Recreation Trail
 Bear Creek Cañon Park
 Bear Creek Regional Park and Nature Center
 Calhan Paint Mines
 Fountain Creek Nature Center
 The Incline
 New Santa Fe Trail
 Pikes Peak Greenway
 White House Ranch National Recreation Trail

Demographics

As of the census of 2000, 516,929 people, 192,409 households, and 133,916 families resided in the county. The population density was 243 people per square mile (94/km2). The 202,428 housing units at averaged 95 per square mile (37/km2). The racial makeup of the county was 81.19% White, 6.51% Black or African American, 0.91% Native American, 2.53% Asian, 0.24% Pacific Islander, 4.70% from other races, and 3.91% from two or more races. About 11.30% of the population was Hispanic or Latino of any race.

Of the 192,409 households, 36.70% had children under the age of 18 living with them, 55.60% were married couples living together, 10.20% had a female householder with no husband present, and 30.40% were not families. Around 23.90% of all households were made up of individuals, and 6.10% had someone living alone who was 65 years of age or older. The average household size was 2.61 and the average family size was 3.11.

In El Paso county, the population pyramid was distributed as there being a slight surplus of males ages 0 to 45 and there after a slight surplus of females which is typical of most US populations. The greater than normal surplus of males between 18 and 35 are mainly due to the presence of five military installations located within the county.

Communities

Cities
 Colorado Springs
 Fountain
 Manitou Springs

Towns
 Calhan
 Green Mountain Falls
 Monument
 Palmer Lake
 Ramah

Census-designated places

 Air Force Academy
 Black Forest
 Cascade-Chipita Park
 Cimarron Hills
 Ellicott
 Fort Carson
 Gleneagle
 Peyton
 Rock Creek Park
 Security-Widefield
 Stratmoor
 Woodmoor

Other unincorporated communities
 Crystola
 Eastonville
 Falcon
 La Foret
 Rush
 Truckton
 Yoder

Government

El Paso County is governed by a board of county commissioners. Its current members are Holly Williams in district 1, Carrie Geitner in district 2, Stan VanderWerf in district 3, Longinos Gonzales Jr in district 4, and Cami Bremer in district 5.

In 2004, the voters of Colorado Springs and El Paso County established the Pikes Peak Rural Transportation Authority (PPRTA) and adopted a 1% sales tax dedicated to improving the region's transportation infrastructure. Together with state funding for COSMIX (2007 completion) and the I-25 interchange with Highway 16 (2008 completion), significant progress has been made since 2003 in addressing the transportation needs of the area. In 2012, the county voted to legalize marijuana. On March 12, 2019, the county commissioners unanimously passed a resolution to become a Second Amendment sanctuary.

The Colorado Department of Corrections has its headquarters in an unincorporated area in the county.

Elected Officials

Top employers
According to the city's 2014 Comprehensive Annual Financial Report, the top employers in the city are:

Libraries 
The Pikes Peak Library District provides library services through its 15 branches and bookmobiles to the residents of El Paso County, with the exception of Widefield School District 3. The mission of the District is "Providing resources and opportunities that impact individual lives and build community. Seek. Engage. Transform."

Politics
El Paso is quite conservative for a large urban county, owing to its large military population and Evangelical Christian population, although has become less so since the 2010s (before then, it was staunchly conservative). Since its creation in 1871, El Paso County has typically voted for the Republican presidential candidate in presidential elections; the last Democratic nominee to win the county was Lyndon B. Johnson in 1964. It has voted Republican in every presidential election since 1920, except for the Democratic landslides of 1936 and 1964.

Dick Lamm in 1982 remains the last Democrat to win the county in a gubernatorial election. Eight years later, the county was one of only four in the state to back governor Roy Romer's opponent John Andrews.
Jared Polis in 2022 came within 4% of winning the county. The last Democrat to win the county in a Senate election was Gary Hart in 1974.

Military installations

El Paso County is home to  Army,  Air Force and Space Force bases. These military installations border Colorado Springs to the north, south, and east, aside from Schriever Space Force Base, which is located about 10 miles east of Peterson Space Force Base.

Fort Carson

Fort Carson, "The Mountain Post", is located just south of Colorado Springs at the base of the Rocky Mountains. It was established in 1942, following Japan's attack on Pearl Harbor. The city of Colorado Springs purchased land south of the city and donated it to the War Department. Construction began immediately and the first building, the camp headquarters, was completed January 31, 1942. Camp Carson was named in honor of the legendary Army scout, Gen. Christopher "Kit" Carson, who explored much of the West in the 1800s. Camp Carson became Fort Carson in 1954. An additional training area was purchased in September 1983 and is called Piñon Canyon Maneuver Site (PCMS).

Currently, Fort Carson is the home of 4th Infantry Division and several other units, including 10th Special Forces Group (Airborne), the Colorado National Guard Regional Training Institute and PCMS, which is a maneuver training site for Fort Carson located near Trinidad, Colorado. The installation totals about 137,000 acres and PCMS is roughly 236,000 acres. Fort Carson has around 3,000 family housing units and 66 soldier barracks with 8,132 rooms. Services on the installation include four elementary schools, one middle school, a commissary, an exchange, and Evans Army Community Hospital, as well as Army Community Service facilities to include child development centers and youth centers and family morale, welfare, and recreation facilities to include a bowling alley, golf course, and numerous parks.

Fort Carson's economic impact on Colorado Springs and the surrounding communities was approximately $2.3 billion during fiscal year 2014. Fort Carson has about 24,300 soldiers on the installation, with 44,700 family members. The installation also has around 8,000 veterans and 3,300 civilians.

Peterson Space Force Base

The Space Force has critical aspects of their service based at Colorado Springs, which carry on missile defense operations and development. The Space Force bases a large section of its national missile defense operations here, with Peterson Space Force Base set to operate large sections of the program. The base is also home to Space Force's Space Operations Command, and to NORAD headquarters.  Peterson SFB is currently the headquarters of the operations-half of Army Space and Missile Defense Command/Army Strategic Command.

Peterson is also headquarters for the United States Northern Command, one of the Unified Combatant Commands, which directs all branches of the U.S. military operations in their area of responsibility, which includes the continental United States, Alaska, Canada, and Mexico. In the event of national emergencies, the President or Secretary of Defense can call upon the command for any required military assistance. Service members from every branch of the US military are stationed at the command.

Peterson SFB is the current, possibly temporary home for US Space Command, another Unified Combatant Command, whose area of operations is global operations occurring 50 miles or greater above the Earth.

Schriever Space Force Base (formerly Schriever AFB and Falcon AFB)

Schriever Space Force Base is home to several Space Force mission Deltas, responsible for the operation and support of 175 Department of Defense satellites and installation support to 16 major tenant units, with a workforce of more than 7,700 personnel. It is the location of the Global Positioning System (GPS) master control station and GPS Operations Center and the US Naval Observatory Alternate Master Clock, used to synchronize GPS satellite time. Schriever is also developing parts of national missile defense and runs parts of the annual wargames used by the nation's military. The base indirectly contributes an estimated $1 billion to the local Colorado Springs, CO area annually.

United States Air Force Academy

Bordering the northwestern side of the city are the grounds of the United States Air Force Academy, where cadets train to become officers in the Air Force and Space Force. The campus is famous for its unique chapel, and draws visitors year round. Most of the Air Force Academy's sports programs participate in the Mountain West Conference.

Cheyenne Mountain Space Force Station (formerly Air Force Station)

The North American Aerospace Defense Command (NORAD), headquartered on Peterson SFB, has a presence in Cheyenne Mountain Space Force Station. When it was built at the height of the Cold War, NORAD caused some anxiety for the residents in and around Colorado Springs, who believed the installation would be a primary target during a nuclear attack. Although NORAD still operates today, it is primarily given the task of the tracking of ICBMs, and the military has recently decided to place Cheyenne Mountain's NORAD/NORTHCOM operations on warm standby and move operations to nearby Peterson Air Force Base.

See also

 Outline of Colorado
 Index of Colorado-related articles
 El Paso County, Jefferson Territory
 Colorado census statistical areas
 Front Range Urban Corridor
 Kirk Hanna Park
 National Register of Historic Places listings in El Paso County, Colorado

Notes

References

External links
 El Paso County Government website
 Colorado County Evolution by Don Stanwyck
 Colorado Historical Society

 

 
Colorado counties
1861 establishments in Colorado Territory
Eastern Plains
Populated places established in 1861